Stampede Wrestling was a Canadian professional wrestling promotion based in Calgary, Alberta. For nearly 50 years, it was one of the main promotions in western Canada and the Canadian Prairies. Originally established by Stu Hart in 1948, the promotion competed with other promotions such as NWA All-Star Wrestling and Pacific Northwest Wrestling and regularly ran events in Calgary's Victoria Pavilion, Ogden Auditorium and the Stampede Corral between 1948 and 1984. Bought out by promoter Vince McMahon, the company was briefly run by the World Wrestling Federation (WWF) before being sold back to the Hart family the following year. Run by Bruce Hart until January 1990, he and Ross Hart reopened the promotion in 1999 and began running events in the Alberta area.

Along with its wrestling school known as "The Dungeon", many of the promotion's former alumni becoming some of the most popular stars in the World Wrestling Federation and other American promotions during the 1980s and 1990s, the promotion produced one of the earliest televised professional wrestling programs (today considered the forerunner of today's WWE) that remained one of Calgary's most popular sports programs eventually airing in over 50 countries.

History

First run (1948–1984)
Stampede Wrestling was formed in 1948 by Stu Hart and Al Oeming under the name Klondike Wrestling, and held their first show on September 11, 1948, at the Sales Pavillion in Edmonton, Alberta. It also become the National Wrestling Alliance's Calgary territory in Canada. In May 1951, they changed its name to Big Time Wrestling. In February 1958, they introduced their version of the NWA International Tag Team Championship to replace the Alberta Tag Team Championship that was retired the year before, which was won by The Kalmikoffs.

In 1959, Oeming retired and Hart took full control of the territory. Hart would also retire their version of the NWA Canadian Tag Team Championship. In 1965, he changed the name of the promotion to Wildcat Wrestling. Finally, in August 1967, he changed it to Stampede Wrestling, and the name stuck. In February 1968, they created their own singles title, the Stampede North American Heavyweight Championship, which was won by Archie Gouldie (the future Mongolian Stomper). Four years later, they retired their version of the NWA Canadian Heavyweight Championship. In June 1978, they introduced the Stampede British Commonwealth Mid-Heavyweight Championship, with Dynamite Kid as their inaugural champion during his first tour in North America. In 1979, Stampede would bring back an old championship, the Stampede World Mid-Heavyweight Championship (the title was first introduced in June 1959, before being quickly abandoned), with Dick Steinborn as champion. In 1982, Stampede withdrew from the NWA.

On December 2, 1983, a riot broke out at the Victoria Pavilion in Calgary during a match between Bret Hart, Davey Boy Smith and Sonny Two Rivers against Bad News Allen, The Stomper and Stomper's kayfabe son Jeff Gouldie. Longtime Stampede announcer Ed Whalen reportedly became distraught during the riot, in which a woman was trampled, causing him to quit from the Stampede on air. Speaking of the events he remarked, "We're starting to scare the patrons with this violence outside the ring, and I will not be associated with it anymore." The event led to Stampede Wrestling being banned from Calgary for six months by the city's wrestling and boxing commission. In August 1984, Stampede Wrestling was sold to the World Wrestling Federation. Of all the talent that WWF took upon their purchase of Stampede, they took only three wrestlers: Bret Hart, Davey Boy Smith, and Dynamite Kid. Their last show was held on November 5, 1984 in Vancouver, British Columbia, as a WWF/Stampede joint show.

Second run (1985–1989)
On October 28, 1985, the WWF sold Stampede back to the Hart family, with Bruce Hart taking the reins, and by 1986, the Calgary territory was given a shot of adrenaline with new talent such as Owen Hart, Brian Pillman, Chris Benoit, Biff Wellington, and Johnny Smith coming in to tangle with Gama Singh and his Karachi Vice stable (which included Shinya Hashimoto, Gary Albright, and Mike Shaw) and The Viet Cong Express (which included a masked Hiroshi Hase). In December 1987, they added a women's championship, the IWA World Women's Championship, with Monster Ripper as their champion, but by January 1989, that championship moved to Japan.

Despite a valiant four years trying to resurrect the wrestling scene in Calgary to its former glory, Stampede officially shut down on December 18, 1989. The closure stemmed from long-standing problems between Bruce Hart and Ed Whalen, producer Fred May's constantly editing too much content off TV, and pay disputes within talent. Their final show before closing down was held in Edmonton on December 16, with Larry Cameron defeating Bob Emory in the main event to retain the North American Heavyweight Championship.

Failed attempts to relaunch
Despite Stampede officially closing down in December 1989, there were several attempts to revive the promotion. The first attempt occurred around March 1990 by Bruce Hart, but it only lasted three months, running smaller towns outside Calgary and Edmonton, due to a lack of approval by the Calgary Wrestling & Boxing Commission to promote shows.  The next attempt was around December 1991 by Abu Wizal, but only lasted a couple weeks. Between July 1995 and July 1997, Bruce Hart promoted one-off shows periodically at the Rockyford Rodeo in Rockyford, Alberta.

On December 15, 1995, a special Stampede Wrestling tribute show was held at the Corral in Calgary, celebrating Stu Hart's life and career. It featured several Stampede alumni, as well as talent from both the World Wrestling Federation and World Championship Wrestling. The main event saw Bret Hart successfully defend the WWF Championship against Davey Boy Smith.

Third run (1999–2008) 
In early 1999, Bruce and Ross Hart reopened Stampede Wrestling, showcasing graduates from the Hart Dungeon training school. However, only weeks after their first event, the promotion once again became inactive following the death of Owen Hart in May. Although considering closing the promotion, the Hart family continued to promote events five months later and began touring western Canada. Although successful, the Harts were forced to cancel several tours in late 2001 and early 2002 due to the arrival of a rival promotion backed by a Calgary businessman. The promotion also lost much of its roster due to its rival hiring away top stars.

In 2005, promoters Bill Bell and Devon Nicholson took over day-to-day operations for Stampede Wrestling. During an event at the Spray Lakes Sawmill Sportsplex in Cochrane, Alberta, Nicholson would face Abdullah the Butcher after the scheduled main event between Lance Storm and Rhyno was canceled when Rhyno failed to appear. At that same event, longtime tag team partners TJ Wilson and Harry Smith faced each other in Smith's final match for the promotion before leaving for World Wrestling Entertainment. Bruce and Ross Hart sold Stampede Wrestling to Bill Bell in 2007. The promotion ceased operations again in April 2008.

Stampede's weekly shows were held mostly at the Victoria Pavilion in Calgary, with special events held at the Stampede Corral.

Television program
Stampede Wrestling was the basis for a long-running weekly sports broadcast produced in Calgary showcasing many of the promotion's most popular wrestlers. Hosted by Ed Whalen  most of its run, which went from 1957 to 1989, the series was syndicated around the world and reruns continue to be shown in some countries to this day. At the time Stampede was revived in 1999, a second Stampede Wrestling TV series was attempted, hosted by Bad News Allen and play by play commentator Mauro Ranallo, but it was short-lived and Whalen was not involved.

Tape library
WWE currently controls Stampede's extensive tape library. In December 2015, the WWE Network began adding Stampede Wrestling shows to its Vault section. However, it was all removed a few days later, after Bret Hart proved that he owned the rights to the footage of his matches.

The Dungeon

Stampede Wrestling was famous for "The Dungeon", a professional wrestling school located in the basement of the Calgary mansion Hart House, home of the Hart family. Stu Hart and Mr. Hito were the main trainers in the Dungeon. The school trained a number of ECW, WCW, WWE and NJPW stars, including the Hart Brothers, Mark Henry, Chris Benoit, Chris Jericho, Ricky Fuji, Hiroshi Hase, Ken Shamrock, Justin Credible and Edge.

Championships

Active until 2008

Retired, defunct, and inactive championships

Former personnel

Modern version (1984-2008)
Male wrestlers

Female wrestlers

Original version (1948–2007)

Adrian Street
Abdullah the Butcher
Bad News Allen
Hercules Ayala
Ben Bassarab
Black Tomcat
Steve Blackman
"Bulldog" Bob Brown
Kerry Brown
Leo Burke
The Bushwackers
Bob Gordon
Larry Cameron
Delbert Wapass
The Cobra
Cuban Assassin
Steve DiSalvo
JR Wapass
Pat Young
Dynamite Kid
Dory Funk Jr.
The Great Gama
Sumo Hara
Bret Hart
 Calvin Wapass
 Tom Mark
Bruce Hart
Keith Hart
Owen Hart
Teddy Hart
Disman Johnson
Mr. Hito
Honky Tonk Wayne
Hiroshi Hase
Allan Mark
Jason the Terrible
Hashif Khan
Killer Khan
Tyson Kidd
 Garry Robertson
 Brian Grandam
Killer Kowalski
Dan Kroffat
Keiichi Yamada
Rick Martel
Don Muraco
 Andy Carmichael
Kendo Nagasaki (Peter Thornley)
Jim "The Anvil" Neidhart
Nattie Neidhart
Brian Pillman
Harley Race
Richard Young
Big Daddy Ritter
Jake Roberts
Goldie Rogers
Mr. Sakurada
Benkei Sasaki
Satoru Sayama 
"Dr. D." David Schultz
Rhonda Sing
Roy Issac
Darcy Parker
Makhan Singh
Vokhan Singh
Davey Boy Smith
Bruce Nielsen
Harry Smith
Johnny Smith
The Stomper
George Senick
Terrible Ted, a black bear
Les Thornton
Biff Wellington

Hall of Fame
The Stampede Wrestling Hall of Fame list professional wrestlers and others who have competed in Stampede Wrestling, from Stu Hart's Klondike Wrestling to the original Stampede Wrestling promotion which closed in 1990.

 – Entries without a birth name indicates that the inductee did not perform under a ring name.
 – This section mainly lists the major accomplishments of each inductee in the Calgary wrestling territory.

Major events

1950s

1960s

1970s

1980s

See also
 Hart Legacy Wrestling

References
General
McCoy, Heath. Pain and Passion: The History of Stampede Wrestling. Toronto: CanWest Books, 2005. 

Specific

Further reading
Books
Ayling, Tom. "Revolutionary: A Biography of George Waclaw Spelvin". (self-published) 2012 
Erb, Marsha. "Stu Hart: Lord of the Ring". Toronto: ECW Press, 2002. 
Hart, Bret. "Hitman: My Real Life in the Cartoon World of Wrestling". Toronto: Random House, 2007. 
Hart, Bruce. "Straight From the Hart". Toronto: ECW Press, 2011. 
Billington, Tom. "Pure Dynamite". Etobicoke: Winding Star Press, 2001. 
Web
http://www.thebarrieexaminer.com/2011/11/04/stampede-comes-to-town
http://slam.canoe.com/Slam/Wrestling/2011/11/03/pf-18922006.html
http://www.huffingtonpost.ca/2012/09/04/stampede-wrestling-comeback-calgary_n_1855346.html
http://www.cbc.ca/news/canada/calgary/calgary-s-stampede-wrestling-looks-to-step-back-in-the-ring-1.1251975

External links
 
 Wrestling-Titles.com: Stampede Wrestling
 The Fight Network: Stampede Wrestling Through the Years by Richard Berger
 KayfabeMemories.com - Regional Territories: Stampede Wrestling
 Stampede stars remember Tiger Khan - Slam! Canoe

 
1948 establishments in Alberta
1950s Canadian sports television series
1960s Canadian sports television series
1970s Canadian sports television series
1980s Canadian sports television series
Companies based in Calgary
National Wrestling Alliance members
Professional wrestling in Alberta